Gabriella Pallotta (born 6 October 1938) is an Italian film actress. She appeared in 22 films between 1956 and 1974. For the film The Pigeon That Took Rome (1962) she was nominated for the Golden Globe Award for Best Supporting Actress.

Filmography

References

External links

1938 births
Living people
Italian film actresses
Actresses from Rome
20th-century Italian actresses

People of Lazian descent